Camasca is a municipality in the Honduran department of Intibucá.

Demographics
At the time of the 2013 Honduras census, Camasca municipality had a population of 6,781. Of these, 94.41% were Indigenous (93.88% Lenca), 5.28% Mestizo, 0.25% Afro-Honduran or Black, 0.01% White and 0.04% others.

References

Municipalities of the Intibucá Department